Ricardo Antonio Rodríguez (born May 21, 1978) is a Dominican former professional baseball pitcher. He played in Major League Baseball (MLB) and the KBO League (KBO) during his career.

Career
In a four-season career, Rodríguez has posted a 10-15 record with 104 strikeouts and a 5.18 ERA in  innings, including one complete game and a shutout.

On June 17, Rodríguez signed with the Edmonton Cracker Cats of the Golden Baseball League.

On January 21, Rodríguez signed with Kia Tigers of the KBO League, but on March 19 he was released from Kia because of an elbow injury. 
He was featured in the 2004 PBS documentary The New Americans as he left the Dominican Republic in hopes of playing baseball in the United States.

External links

1978 births
Living people
Albuquerque Isotopes players
Buffalo Bisons (minor league) players
Cleveland Indians players
Dominican Republic expatriate baseball players in Canada
Dominican Republic expatriate baseball players in Mexico
Dominican Republic expatriate baseball players in South Korea
Dominican Republic expatriate baseball players in Taiwan
Dominican Republic expatriate baseball players in the United States
Dominican Republic sportspeople in doping cases
Edmonton Cracker-Cats players
Great Falls Dodgers players
Indianapolis Indians players
Jacksonville Suns players
KBO League pitchers
Kia Tigers players
Las Vegas 51s players
Major League Baseball pitchers
Major League Baseball players from the Dominican Republic
Memphis Redbirds players
Mexican League baseball pitchers
Oklahoma RedHawks players
People from Monte Cristi Province
Richmond Braves players
Saraperos de Saltillo players
Sinon Bulls players
Texas Rangers players
Vero Beach Dodgers players
Azucareros del Este players
Leones del Escogido players
Tigres del Licey players
Estrellas Orientales players